Revolver is a 2005 action thriller film co-written and directed by Guy Ritchie, and starring Jason Statham, Ray Liotta, Vincent Pastore and André Benjamin. The film centres on a revenge-seeking confidence trickster whose weapon is a universal formula that guarantees victory to its user, when applied to any game or confidence trick.

This is the fourth feature film by Ritchie and his third to centre on crime and professional criminals, but also has a strong philosophy and Buddhist moral content. It was released in UK theatres on 22 September 2005.  It performed poorly at the box office and received negative reviews. A reworked version was released to a limited number of US theatres on 7 December 2007.

Plot

Note: There are two different versions of Revolver. This plot synopsis is for Ritchie's preferred Directors Cut.

In an unidentified city, cockney gangster and gambler Jake Green (Jason Statham) is released from prison after a seven year stretch in solitary confinement for an unspecified crime. Because of this, Jake developed claustrophobia: he becomes incredibly anxious in tight spaces and despises riding in elevators.

Two years later, Jake and his brother Billy (Andrew Howard) travel to a casino owned by Dorothy Macha (Ray Liotta), a gang boss involved in illegal gambling all over the city. Macha is responsible for ordering Green to commit the crime that resulted in his prison sentence. Though Billy is reluctant, the brothers have arrived to collect the debt that Green believes the gangster owes them. Macha promptly calls them up to a private area of his casino where a high rollers' game is taking place. Jake bets a fortune on a chip toss with one of the table's players, and loses. Manipulating Macha into a sense of false security, he makes the same bet with him, but this time, he wins. Humiliated, Macha orders his right-hand man, Paul (Terence Maynard) to have Jake murdered.

As Jake and his brothers leave the casino, a man (Vincent Pastore) hands Jake a card and tells him that he can help him. Jake's phobia forces him to take the stairs. In the stairwell, Jake looks at the card and collapses, falling down the stairs. The card is revealed to read "Take the Elevator". Jake is rushed to the hospital. The doctors report that they don't know why he fainted, but inform him they will have the results in a few days. Later Jake arrives home, without Billy, where Macha's assassin Sorter (Mark Strong) is waiting for him.

On his doorstep there is another card, which reads "Pick This Up". As Jake bends to retrieve the card bullets fly over his back. As the shooting continues, the same mysterious individual, a loan shark named Zach, arrives and rescues Jake, who is the only person to survive the hit. Zach introduces Jake to his partner, Avi (André Benjamin). They offer him a deal: they will take all of his money and he will do what they say, no questions asked. In exchange, they will protect Jake from Macha. In the course of their proposal, they show Jake his medical file, which they have mysteriously obtained. It indicates that the blackout occurred due to a rare blood disease which will cause his death within three days. Jake suspects he is being conned and leaves.

Later, at a visit to his doctor, he is given the same prognosis and said to have three days to live. Jake returns to Avi and Zach's poolhall with a satchel of money and agrees to their terms. The mysterious men reveal that his money will be used to fund their money lending enterprise, then question Jake about his time in prison. Jake explains that he was given a choice to either spend 14 years in the general prison population or 7 years in solitary confinement, of which he chose the latter.

During his stint in solitary confinement, Jake learns of a specific strategy (referred to as "The Formula") that is supposed to let its user win every game. The Formula itself was discovered by two unnamed men who inhabited adjacent cells on either side of Jake's own. They are referred to as a chess expert and a con man. During the first five years of his seven-year sentence, the three men communicate their thoughts on confidence tricks and chess moves via messages hidden inside library books, such as The Mathematics of Quantum Mechanics.

The chess expert and the con man plan to leave their cells simultaneously, and promise to take Jake with them. But when they disappear from their cells, they leave Jake behind to serve the remaining two years of his sentence. When Jake is released, he finds that all of his possessions and money have been taken by the two men with whom he had shared everything. Disheartened, he uses The Formula, to go about winning at various casinos. Jake garnered a reputation that led many gambling houses to fear his freakishly good 'luck', and is blacklisted by many casinos. The Formula applies to any game, and is often exemplified by Jake's apparent mastery of chess.

Meanwhile, Macha brokers a cocaine deal with Lily Walker (Francesca Annis), the advisor of unseen crime kingpin Sam Gold, who is supposedly the "ultimate figure" that all other underworld members aspire to be. Walker warns Macha that Sam Gold is not someone to be delayed and emphasizes that he "hates publicity". Jake accompanies Avi and Zach as they perform a heist of a vault full of the cocaine from Macha's casino. Desperate that he is now indebted to Gold, Macha sends Paul to appeal to his rival, Triad kingpin Lord John (Tom Wu) to sell him replacement cocaine at a heavily inflated price. Lord John insultingly declines making a deal with his enemy. With Jake, Zach and Avi then rob John for millions of dollars; Framing Macha for the theft.

Furious, Lord John sends a hitwoman dressed as a waitress to kill Macha at his restaurant. Sorter shoots the assassin, but only wounds her. Then he travels outside and kills her getaway driver as he attempts to flee in a car. Inside, Macha struggles with the hitwoman, during which she shoots his finger off. In a rage, Macha empties his bodyguard's pistol into the assassin. In retaliation, Macha has Sorter kill Lord John, then sends Paul and his henchmen to interrogate members of John's triad to find the location of the stolen cocaine. The Chinese gangsters deny any involvement, and implicate Jake even when Paul tortures them to death.

Zach and Avi have Jake donate all the money he has given them so far to a child's charity in Macha's name. Macha takes the credit, believing it will improve his reputation. However, he is later visited by Walker, who claims that Gold is furious at Macha's newfound publicity and his constant delaying of the deal. Macha pleads for more time to settle business but Walker simply leaves with a cryptic threat.

Three days after Jake found out about his terminal diagnoses, he awakes to a call from Avi, who tells him he is "free" of his disease.  Jake returns to his physician, who reveals that the original diagnosis was incorrect; Jake suffers from a rare blood disease, but it is treatable and not terminal. The doctor apologizes profusely for the mistake. Meanwhile, Macha, now believing Jake is the one conspiring against him, doubles down on the contract against him. His henchmen track him down to a house inhabited by Avi and Zach, but he evades them. In the chase, one of the hitmen falls on his shotgun and dies. The gangsters misinterpret this accident, and believe that Jake killed him.

Jake meets Avi and Zach on a rooftop, where it is revealed that they were Jake's "neighbors" during his years of incarceration. They reveal that Sam Gold is an ultimately powerless cipher, whose power is granted only by those who invest in him. He represents ego and is the personification of greed. Avi attempts to get Jake to understand the nature of the ego and to challenge his own lifelong investment in it. The men explain to Jake that by stripping him of the physical embodiment of ego (his money) they have freed him from Gold's "game" - It is heavily implied that "Avi" and "Zach" are merely figments of Jake's imagination.

Elsewhere, to settle a debt with Macha, Jake's brother Billy is betrayed by his bodyguard, who lets Sorter and Paul into Billy's home. Paul tortures Billy, threatens to kidnap Billy's daughter and set him on fire in order to find out where Jake is. The violent acts unsettle Sorter, and allow him to find his conscience. Against his better judgement, he rejects his ego by killing Paul and all his companions to rescue the girl.

(Note: In the theatrical release, Sorter is killed and the girl is taken.)

That night, an armed Jake breaks into the penthouse where Macha is sleeping. Surprisingly, he kneels before the bed and asks a half naked Macha for forgiveness. Jake leaves in the elevator, which gets stuck at the 13th floor. Macha retrieves his own handgun, and rushes down the stairs to meet Jake on the ground floor. While waiting in the elevator, Jake has a conversation in his mind in which he rejects his ego. By doing this, Jake steps off the proverbial chess board by making a conscious effort to reverse everything his ego tells him to do. This is seen to be the truest and most fundamental application of the Formula.

As the doors open on Jake and he is about to leave the building, Macha holds him at gunpoint, but a calm Jake refuses to fear him. He leaves Macha a crying, pathetic mess, weeping in the foyer of his penthouse - Jake has rejected the ego, where as Macha has been seen to be consumed by it, resulting in his humiliation.

(Note: This is where the Director's Cut ends.)

In the theatrical release of the film, Jake finds out about the niece's kidnapping and decides to return the crime bosses money to save her. When he arrives, Macha points a gun on Jake's niece, but Jake shows no fear. A humiliated Macha remarks that Jake can't kill him if he is already dead. Then he puts the gun to his head and pulls the trigger as the screen cuts to black.

Cast
 Jason Statham as Jake Green
 Ray Liotta as Dorothy Macha
 Vincent Pastore as Zach
 André Benjamin as Avi
 Mark Strong as Sorter
 Tom Wu as Lord John
 Terence Maynard as French Paul (credited as Terrence Maynard)
 Andrew Howard as Billy
 Francesca Annis as Lily Walker
 Anjela Lauren Smith as Doreen
 Elana Binysh as Rachel

Themes 
Guy Ritchie was, during the time of conceiving and executing the film, interested in Kabbalah. The film itself is laced with references to Kabbalistic ideas, symbols and numerological references.<ref>{{cite web|title="As early as 2003 Ritchie encountered trouble finding a studio to support Revolver. References to Kabbalah in the script made studios like Sony back off. Kabbalah has a reputation as a cult, they feared. .."|author=Mark Webster|url=http://www.the213.net/php/article.php?id=323|website=The123.net|access-date=23 September 2017}}</ref>

The trinity of Zach (either from Hebrew זְכַרְיָה Zechariah ′Yah has remembered′ or יִצְחָק Yitskhak [Isaac] '[he] will laugh'), Jake (from Hebrew יַעֲקֹב Yaʿaqov [Jacob] from the root עקב ʿqb 'to follow', 'to be behind', 'to supplant', 'circumvent', 'assail', 'overreach') and Avi (Hebrew אֲבִי ′my father′) are representative of Kabbalistic right, centre and left pillar energies, respectively. Avi is a black man who is somewhat effeminate in his physical appearance, clothing and mannerisms. The 'left pillar' or 'left column' in Kabbalistic traditions is often associated with 'the feminine' and with the colour black. Jake's surname is "Green", and the colour green is associated with Netzach, the sphere ruled by Venus (Love) on the Tree of Life. Zach is a hefty, gargantuan, white man who 'dresses down' in a very archetypically 'masculine' way. Both masculinity and the colour white are associated with right column or right pillar energies in Kabbalistic traditions.

The number 32 comes up repeatedly. "The chess game has many mystical meanings.  The Temple of Solomon was chequered like a chessboard, which has 64 squares and 32 pieces." The lift that Jake enters near the end of the movie has buttons for 32 floors.

The dollar bills shown in Jack's money bags have a denomination of 12 (Twelve). No explanation for this has yet been discovered.

 Soundtrack 

According to director Guy Ritchie, the music for the film was initially intended to follow in a similar vein to his previous crime movies, Lock, Stock and Two Smoking Barrels and Snatch, in that it was to be primarily source-based (i.e. using non-original music). Those source tracks would all have been classical in nature. However, during the production process, Ritchie changed his mind and decided to score a majority of the film with original music, leaving only some small sections to non-original music tracks (such as the restaurant shoot-out during Lord John's attempted assassination of Dorothy Maccha). Ritchie selected Nathaniel Mechaly to compose the score.

The score was performed by Mechaly on Mini Moog and other keyboards, with drummer Maxime Garoute.

All tracks composed by Nathaniel Mechaly and Maxime Garoute except where otherwise noted.
 "Revolver" – 03:58
 "Later That Night" – 02:02
 "Atom's Tomb" (Electrelane) – 02:11
 "The Heist" – 02:52
 "Fear Me" – 03:42
 "Mucchio Selvaggio" (Ennio Morricone, performed by 2raumwohnung) – 05:06
 "Chess Room" – 02:03
 "Sorter Shoot Out" – 01:56
 "Purple Requiem" – 04:00
 "3 Eddie Story" – 02:40
 "End Casino" – 02:50
 "Opera" (from Antonio Vivaldi's Nisi Dominus, third movement, performed by Emmanuel Santarromana) – 04:03
 "Casino" – 01:54
 "Jack Accident" – 02:02
 "The Mental Traveler" – 04:08
 "To Never Miss" – 01:18
 "Ask Yourself" (Plastikman) – 08:51
 "Gnossienne No. 1" (from Erik Satie performed by Alessandra Celletti) – 04:18
 "Metropolitan" (Emmanuel Santarromana) – 3:18

 Home media  
 Extras featuring director Guy Ritchie.
 The Concept: an interview with director Guy Ritchie and editor James Herbert on the subject of the film's conceptual and editorial development.
 The Game: The Making Of Revolver Stills gallery (over 100 stills against film soundtrack).
 7 deleted scenes with director's commentary.
 Outtakes
 Music Trailer
 Audio
 Dolby Digital 5.1
 DTS Digital Surround 5.1
 Aspect ratio
 2.35 Widescreen / Color
 Regional format
 Revolver is currently available in both Regions 1 & 2 on DVD.
 Region 2 is the original 2005 theatrical release, while Region 1 is the 2007 reedited version, created by Ritchie to simplify and/or clarify some plot points after criticism that the film was too hard to follow.

 Reception 

 Critical response 
The film was generally panned by critics, who viewed it as pretentious with an over-complicated plot. On Rotten Tomatoes it has an approval rating of 15% based on reviews from 67 critics, with an average score of 3.50/10. The consensus reads, "In attempting to meld his successful previous formulas with philosophical musings, Guy Ritchie has produced an incoherent misfire." Reviews were so poor in the UK that a positive quote placed prominently on the film's poster, saying that the director was "back to his best" and attributed to the newspaper The Sun, in fact came from a promotional section of the Sun's website created and paid for by a PR agency on behalf of the film's distributors.

There are some positive reviews as well. Mark R. Leeper conceded that it was "a film for a narrow audience", but said that he personally rather "liked it" and gave it a score of 7/10. According to Brian Orndorf, Revolver "is the perfect movie for those who like to crack things open and dig around the innards", saying that it "reminded [him] quite a bit of Richard Kelly's film, Donnie Darko". He goes on to explain that "both films have a taste for the deliberately confusing, sharing scripts that take the viewer on a ride that requires much more than one simple viewing."

Box office
As of 20 December 2005 the film had grossed $6,811,925.

References

External links

 
 
 
 
 OhmyNews Review
 "How to flog a turkey" – The Guardian, 3 October 2005, on Revolver'''s UK poster quotes

2005 films
2005 action thriller films
2005 crime drama films
2005 crime thriller films
2000s gang films
British action thriller films
British crime drama films
British gangster films
2000s English-language films
Films scored by Nathaniel Méchaly
Films directed by Guy Ritchie
Films produced by Luc Besson
French crime drama films
Films with screenplays by Guy Ritchie
Films with screenplays by Luc Besson
2005 drama films
Triad films
2000s British films
2000s French films
2000s Hong Kong films